Chutes-de-la-Chaudière is a provincial electoral district in the Chaudière-Appalaches region of Quebec, Canada that elects members to the National Assembly of Quebec. The district is located within the city of Lévis, and comprises part of the borough of Les Chutes-de-la-Chaudière-Est (the part that is south of Autoroute 20) and all of the borough of Les Chutes-de-la-Chaudière-Ouest.

It was created for the 1989 election from parts of Beauce-Nord and Lévis electoral districts.  For that first election only, its name was Les Chutes-de-la-Chaudière.

Members of the National Assembly

Election results

|}

^ Change is from redistributed results. CAQ change is from ADQ.

|-
 
|Liberal
|Réal St-Laurent
|align="right"|10,657
|align="right"|30.71
|align="right"|

|-

|}

|-
 
|Liberal
|France Proulx
|align="right"|7,292
|align="right"|17.65
|align="right"|-15.50
|-

|-

|}
* Result compared to UFP

|-
 
|Liberal
|Pauline Houde-Landry
|align="right"|12,601
|align="right"|33.15
|align="right"|+2.83

|-

|}

|-
 
|Liberal
|Christian Jobin
|align="right"|13,796
|align="right"|30.32
|align="right"|+7.67

|-
 
|Socialist Democracy
|Mario Trépanier
|align="right"|358
|align="right"|0.79
|align="right"|-1.26
|-
 
|Independent
|Steve Caouette
|align="right"|286
|align="right"|0.63
|align="right"|-
|}

|-
 
|Liberal
|Shirley Baril
|align="right"|9,220
|align="right"|22.65
|align="right"|-22.95

|-

|Independent
|Alphonse Bernard Carrier
|align="right"|904
|align="right"|2.22
|align="right"|-
|-

|New Democrat
|Mario Trépanier
|align="right"|834
|align="right"|2.05
|align="right"|-2.59
|-

|Independent
|Jean Duchesneau
|align="right"|640
|align="right"|1.57
|align="right"|-
|-

|Independent
|Pierre Chamberland
|align="right"|483
|align="right"|1.19
|align="right"|-
|-

|Natural Law
|Eddy Gagné
|align="right"|279
|align="right"|0.69
|align="right"|-
|}

|-

|-
 
|Liberal
|Denis Therrien
|align="right"|14,805
|align="right"|45.60
|-

|New Democrat
|Dany Gravel
|align="right"|1,505
|align="right"|4.64

References

External links
Information
 Elections Quebec

Election results
 Election results (National Assembly)

Maps
 2011 map (PDF)
 2001 map (Flash)
2001–2011 changes (Flash)
1992–2001 changes (Flash)
 Electoral map of Chaudière-Appalaches region
 Quebec electoral map, 2011

Politics of Lévis, Quebec
Chutes-de-la-Chaudiere